33 may refer to:
33 (number)
33 BC
AD 33
1933
2033

Music
33 (Luis Miguel album) (2003)
33 (Southpacific album) (1998)
33 (Wanessa album) (2016)
"33 'GOD'", a 2016 song by Bon Iver
"Thirty-Three" (song), a 1995 song by the Smashing Pumpkins
"Thirty Three", a song by Karma to Burn from the album Almost Heathen, 2001
"33", a 2002 song by Coheed and Cambria
"33" a 2020 song by Polo G
La 33, a Colombian salsa music band

Television
El 33, a Catalan television channel
"33" (Battlestar Galactica), an episode of Battlestar Galactica

Other uses
Los 33, the miners involved in the 2010 Copiapó mining accident
The 33, a 2015 film based on the Copiapó mining accident
Thirty Three (film), a 1965 Soviet comedy film by Georgi Daneliya
+33, the international calling code for France
33, a label printed on Rolling Rock beer bottles

See also

  (disambiguation)
 Alfa Romeo 33, an Italian automobile
 Club 33, a set of private clubs in Disney Parks
 List of highways numbered 33
 Treinta y Tres, a city in Uruguay